Adarrus is a genus of true bugs belonging to the family Cicadellidae.

The genus was first described by H. Ribaut in 1946.

The species of this genus are found in Europe.

Species:
 Adarrus bellevoyei Puton, 1877

References

Cicadellidae
Cicadellidae genera